is a Japanese football player.

Club career statistics
Updated to 8 March 2018.

References

External links

Profile at YSCC

1990 births
Living people
Association football people from Saitama Prefecture
Japanese footballers
J1 League players
J2 League players
J3 League players
Japan Football League players
Kashiwa Reysol players
Fagiano Okayama players
FC Gifu players
YSCC Yokohama players
ReinMeer Aomori players
Association football midfielders